Badamuk (also Romanized as Bādāmūk, Bādāmak, and Bādūmak; also known as Bādāmūn) is a village in Baghestan Rural District, in the Eslamiyeh District of Ferdows County, South Khorasan Province, Iran. At the 2006 census, its population was 248, in 96 families.

References 

Populated places in Ferdows County